The Church of Santa Anna (Catalan: Església de Santa Anna, Spanish: Iglesia de Santa Ana) is a church located in Barcelona, Catalonia, Spain. It was declared Bien de Interés Cultural in 1881.

See also 
 List of Bien de Interés Cultural in the Province of Barcelona

References 

Bien de Interés Cultural landmarks in the Province of Barcelona
Roman Catholic churches in Barcelona